Freaks is a 2018 science fiction thriller film written and directed by Zach Lipovsky and Adam Stein. Starring Emile Hirsch, Bruce Dern, Grace Park, Amanda Crew, and Lexy Kolker, the film follows a seven-year-old girl (Kolker) who leaves her home for the first time after being kept inside by her father (Hirsch).

The film premiered at the Toronto International Film Festival on September 8, 2018, and was released commercially in North America on September 13, 2019, by Well Go USA Entertainment. It received positive reviews, with praise for Kolker's performance.

Plot
Seven-year-old Chloe Lewis has spent her entire life confined to a decrepit house with her father Henry, who forbids her from leaving under the threat of being killed by "the bad men". Despite her father's warnings, Chloe longs to experience the world outside her home and desires a maternal figure in her life, due to never meeting her deceased mother Mary. To help Chloe have a normal life, Henry seeks to educate her on general social behavior so she will one day be able to pose as a member of the neighboring Reed family. Chloe observes strange occurrences in the house, such as Henry expelling blood from his eyes and visions of a woman in her closet. Over time, she learns about "abnormals", individuals with superhuman abilities who are hunted by the government's Abnormal Defense Force (ADF) and contained in an underground facility known as Madoc Mountain.

When Chloe eventually manages to leave the house, she discovers her own abnormal power of telepathy at the prodding of an elderly ice cream truck driver. The ice cream truck driver reveals he is Chloe's maternal grandfather Alan, who believes his daughter Mary is still alive. Chloe realizes that the ghostly woman in her closet is Mary, who is being held captive at Madoc Mountain. Henry and Alan are also revealed as abnormals, identified by their bleeding eyes. Henry uses his time-altering powers to cause only a few months to pass outside of the house during his seven years with Chloe. Upon discovering that Chloe has left the house and been in contact with Alan, Henry brings her to the Reeds with a large sum of money, only to be turned away when Chloe uses her abilities on the Reed matriarch Nancy. Nancy subsequently contacts the ADF to deal with Chloe and her family, but Chloe tricks the agents into believing the Reeds are abnormals and they kill Nancy.

Using her telepathic abilities, Chloe begins to help Mary escape from Madoc Mountain, but is hindered by the arrival of ADF Agent Cecilia Ray at the house. When Henry and Alan attempt to deal with Ray, the agent reveals she knows the truth about their family and a drone strike will be ordered on the house if they kill her. Ray offers to place Chloe under governmental care, but upon realizing Henry and Alan are stalling, a scuffle ensues that leads to Ray killing Alan and mortally wounding Henry before she is killed by Chloe. Henry manages to delay the ADF agents long enough for Chloe to ensure Mary's escape, then uses his abilities to manipulate time and carry his daughter out of the house as it is destroyed by the missile.

After Henry succumbs to his injuries, Mary arrives using her flight abilities and kills the remaining ADF agents. Mary promises to keep Chloe hidden at a new location, but Chloe refuses to continue hiding, believing that no one can stop them from living wherever they want. Moved by her daughter's confidence, Mary agrees and flies off with Chloe.

Cast

 Emile Hirsch as Henry Lewis, Chloe's father who can slow down time
 Bruce Dern as Alan / Mr. Snowcone, Chloe's maternal grandfather who can turn invisible
 Grace Park as Cecilia Ray, a government agent with the Abnormal Defense Force (ADF)
 Amanda Crew as Mary Lewis, Chloe's mother who possesses the ability to fly
 Lexy Kolker as Chloe Lewis, a seven-year-old telepath
 Ava Telek as Harper Reed, Nancy and Steven's daughter
 Michelle Harrison as Nancy Reed, Harper's mother and Steven's wife
 Matty Finochio as Steven Reed, Harper's father and Nancy's husband
 Aleks Paunovic as Robert Kraigen, a guard at Madoc Mountain

Additionally, R. J. Fetherstonhaugh portrays a police officer who encounters Chloe and Alan at a park. Dakota Daulby appears as the Madoc Mountain executioner and Dean Redman plays an ADF captain.

Release
Freaks premiered at the Toronto International Film Festival on September 8, 2018. Two days later, Well Go USA Entertainment acquired distribution rights to the film.

After Toronto, the film screened at over 40 film festivals around the world, including the Sitges Film Festival in Spain, the Santa Barbara Film Festival, the Cinequest Film Festival, Cleveland Film Festival, and the Vancouver International Film Festival, where it was awarded the Emerging Director award. The Vancouver festival programmers wrote "Zach Lipovsky and Adam Stein's skewed sci-fi thriller ratchets up the go-for-broke audacity as it laces the family drama of Room with genre confections indebted to vintage Spielberg."

Freaks won the Asteroide Award, the top prize at the Trieste Science+Fiction Festival in Italy, and the Audience Award at Utopiales in France. It won Best Film and the Audience Award at the Paris International Fantastic Film Festival and won the Silver Raven Jury Prize at the Brussels International Fantastic Film Festival.

Freaks was released in theaters in the U.S. and Canada on September 13, 2019. It was released for online sales and VOD on December 3, 2019, with a Blu-ray and DVD release on December 10, 2019.

Reception

Box office
Freaks grossed $276,591 in the United States and Canada, and $73,531 in other territories, for a total worldwide gross of $350,112.

Critical response
The website's critical consensus reads, "Stocked with solid performances, Freaks is a clever sci-fi/horror hybrid that suggests a bright future for co-writers/co-directors Zach Lipovsky and Adam Stein." On Metacritic, the film has a weighted average score of 63 out of 100 based on 16 critic reviews, indicating "generally favorable reviews".

Germain Lussier of io9 called Freaks "a wonderful, exciting film, filled with complex, robust ideas that not only have a unique twist to them but a realistic grounding that makes them more relatable and impactful."

In The Hollywood Reporter, Justin Lowe praised the film's lead performances, stating that young Lexy Kolker's "semi-improvised performance couldn't be any more authentic and she's well matched with Hirsch, drawing on his own parental experience, as her conflicted and overprotective father. The ever-versatile Dern delivers a slyly subversive turn as Mr. Snowcone, whose hidden agenda involves much more than frozen treats."

Other reviewers praised Kolker as well. Colliders Perri Nemiroff called her performance "truly unforgettable work" and Varietys Andrew Barker said "relative newcomer Kolker carries the film effortlessly." In its summary of the Toronto Film Festival, TheWrap listed Kolker as a potential award contender.

In December 2018, the Toronto International Film Festival named the film to its annual year-end Canada's Top Ten list. After its online release in December 2019, Freaks topped the charts as the bestselling independent film on iTunes.

References

External links
 
 

2018 films
2018 thriller films
English-language Canadian films
American science fiction thriller films
Canadian science fiction thriller films
2010s science fiction thriller films
Films shot in Vancouver
2010s English-language films
2010s American films
2010s Canadian films